Fortier River may refer to:

 Fortier River (Bécancour River tributary)
 Fortier River (Panache River tributary)
 Fortier River, a tributary of the Gatineau River in Quebec, Canada

See also
Fortier (disambiguation)